Kandamangalam is a suburban revenue block in the Viluppuram district of Tamil Nadu, India. It is located at about 15 km from Puducherry Main city. All the four sides are surrounded by Puducherry. It has important administrative offices like Block Development Office, Revenue Inspector Office, and VAO Office. Kandamangalam police station (B-6) is located at about 500 meters from Kandamangalam Bus Stop.

Connectivity

Bus Facility

Puducherry- Villupuram Highway (NH-45A) runs in the places of Villiyanur, Kandamangalam, Valavanur, Koliyanur. The Project NH 332 (Puducherry to Nagapattinam) which runs in the places of Puducherry, Villiyanur, Kandamangalam Nagapattinam is under process . It has two bus stops- One near BDO Office and another near Old Police Station. There is a 24/7 Bus Facility. You may probably get buses for every 5 mins, buses including ordinary, deluxe buses.

Railway Line

The Puduchery railway line is one of the oldest rail link in India and it was constructed in the year 1879 by the Puducherry Railway Company during the period of French and British rule in India. One of the boarding points is Kandamangalam. Under the supervision of South Indian Railway with the object of connecting the town and the port of Puducherry with South India and to develop the resources of the Puducherry Territory, the rail link between Puducherry and Villupuram has been established. Even though there was total enmity between the then Super Powers—the French and the English—when it came to economic development they had a very good understanding and the Puducherry Railway system was a good example of it.

The station is operated by the Southern Railway zone of the Indian Railways and comes under the Tiruchirapalli railway division. This Division may be the only Division in the world maintaining the Railways developed by both the British and the French empires.

It has daily trains connecting the city with Chennai apart from non-daily trains towards prime cities including Mangaluru, Tiruchirapalli, Bengaluru, Kolkata, New Delhi, Bhubaneshwar and Mumbai via Villupuram.

Thirunareeswarar Temple

Thirunareeswarar Temple is a Hindu Temple Dedicated to Lord Shiva located at Kandamangalam. The temple is located very near to Union Territory of Puducherry. Presiding deity is called as Thirunareeswarar and mother is called as Thiripurasundari. The Temple is under the control of Archeological Survey of India. This temple was built by Kandarathitha Chola. The temple is facing east with an entrance arch. Palipeedam, Dwajasthambam and Nandhi are situated immediately after the entrance arch. Presiding deity is housed in the sanctum. The sanctum sanctorum consists of sanctum, antarala and arthamandapam. The root is flat on the sanctum without any Vimana. Stucco Images of Dwarabalakars are found at the entrance of sanctum.

Life

People here enjoys almost a city life as they can get any things that they need, good hospital facilities (Primary Health Centre, Sri Venkateshwaraa Medical College Hospital and Research Centre, Sri Manakula Vinayagar Medical College and Hospital), schools, good companies etc.

References

External links
 

Revenue blocks of Villupuram district